The University Transition Program, often called the Transition Program, UBC Transitions, UTP, or simply Transition, is an early college entrance program funded by the Vancouver School Board, the University of British Columbia and the BC Ministry of Education that is based in the University of British Columbia in Vancouver, British Columbia, Canada. Each year, the program accepts around 20 new students between the ages 12 and 15, half of which are from outside the Vancouver School District. Over the course of two years, students complete required high school curriculum along with some university coursework. When they graduate from the program, the students are usually accepted into UBC earlier than they would if they had graduated from a regular high school (aged 14–17 instead of 18–19). The program was first established in 1993 by the Vancouver School Board, British Columbia Ministry of Education and the University of British Columbia. Students of the program have access to most UBC facilities and are eligible to possess UBC undergraduate student cards. The program held its 20th anniversary on May 15–17, 2015.

Location
The Transition Program is located within the University of British Columbia, in the Auditorium Annex located on West Mall. It is above the Math Graduates office, across from the Pacific Institute of Mathematical Sciences building, and behind the Walter C. Koerner Library.

Program
The University Transition Program consists of two years of instruction.

Achievements

 The Transition Program had won the 2008 Grades 8 and 9 Math Challengers, the 2009 Grade 9 Math Challengers, the 2011 Grade 9 Math Challengers, the 2012 Grade 8 Math Challengers, the 2015 Grade 9 Provincial Math Challengers, the 2018 Grade 8 and 9 Regional Math Challengers, and the 2020 Grade 8, 9 and 10 Regional Math Challengers. Students from the Transition Program have held quite good placements in the Provincial Math Challengers competitions.
 Students have been invited to Seattle for the Northwest Intramurals Math Competition.
 The Transition Program has won awards at Model United Nations Conferences.
 The Transition Program has won a Reach for the Top Junior Championship in 2003.
 The Transition Program has won a bronze medal in a Reach for the Top Junior Championship in 2014.
 The Transition Program has won a silver medal in a Reach for the Top Junior Championship in 2018.
 The Transition Program has won a silver medal in a Reach for the Top Junior Championship in 2020.
The Transition Program has won a gold medal in a Reach for the Top Junior Championship in 2021.
 The Transition Program is the winner of the 2009 Investja investment competition.
 Four students from the Transition Program won the physics competition, B.C.'s Brightest Minds, in 2009 and 2010 (Allen Zhang and Yin Shu Yang in 2010, Karlming Chen and Angus Lim in 2009). Two students, Jessica Qiu and YJ Shin, came third place in 2011.
 Students from the Transition Program have won many awards in the Greater Vancouver Regional Science Fair competitions.
 Students from the Transition Program have been invited to the Canada-Wide Science Fair competitions as Finalists and won awards.
 Cheng Xie, a student from the Transition Program, won the 2014 Schulich Leader Scholarship.
Emilie Ma, a student from the Transition Program, won the 2021 Schulich Leader Scholarship

References

External links 
  Location of the University Transition Program: Auditorium Annex Offices B
  Frequently Asked Questions
  UTP Reunion 2020
  Monthly Transition Newsletter
  University Transition Program Application Document

Educational organizations based in British Columbia